Abdellatif Maazouz (born 18 August 1954, in Sefrou) is a Moroccan politician of the Istiqlal Party. Between 2007 and 2012 he was Minister of Foreign Trade in the Cabinet of Abbas El Fassi. On 3 January 2012, he was appointed Delegate-Minister for Moroccans Living Abroad in the cabinet of Abdelilah Benkirane, he held this post until 9 July 2013, when his party members quit the government. On 22 September 2021, he was elected as the president of the Council of the Casablanca-Settat region.

See also
Cabinet of Morocco

References

External links
Department of the Moroccans Living Abroad

Living people
Government ministers of Morocco
1954 births
People from Sefrou
Sidi Mohamed Ben Abdellah University alumni
University of Toulouse alumni
Istiqlal Party politicians